Mike Dusi (born March 11, 1981) is an American actor and producer.

Early life 

Dusi's family is originally from Albania.  He was raised in Queens, New York and lives in Los Angeles, California.  He originally trained as an MCSE, but quickly dropped that when it didn't fit his active lifestyle.  His cousin later introduced him to acting, but he didn't take it seriously until he moved to Los Angeles.

Career 

Dusi favors action and comedy films, where he makes use of his Shotokan skills.  Dusi's latest film is named Mikeyboy, which he produced.  It tells the semi-autobiographical story of an Albanian-American family who work in a pizzeria and share their modern Albanian traditions. In 2011, he was associate producer on All's Faire in Love, a comedy about dueling renaissance fairs.  He also began work on How Hard Can It Be, a mockumentary set in Ozone Park, Queens about a local pizzeria worker who decides to make films.

Filmography 

 Desert of Blood (2006)
 Dorm of the Dead (2006) 
 All's Faire In Love (2009), associate producer
 Hit and Run (2009)
 Ecommando (2010)
 Kissing Strangers (2010)
 Amy Allyson Fans (2011)
 Mikeyboy (2013)
 A Foreign Exchange Love (2014)

References

External links 

 

20th-century American male actors
21st-century American male actors
American people of Albanian descent
Living people
1981 births